Dudding is a British surname. Notable people with the surname include: 

Liam Dudding (born 1994), New Zealand cricketer 
Robin Dudding (1935–2008), New Zealand literary editor and journalist
Rodger Dudding (born 1937), British business magnate

English-language surnames